Ghazieh is a town in South Lebanon, 4 kilometres south of Saida, (Sidon). It has an area of about 15sq km.

Ghazieh is one of the largest businesses hubs in South Lebanon and it houses a large fuel refinery (TapLine).

Ghazieh is bordered by a number of villages in the southern and western side such as Qinnarit, Magdouche, Darb es Sim, Zaita, Aaqtanit, Maamriye, Zahrani.

Major streets include: Bashroun, Regy, Zambil, El Ain,  El Baidar, El Rabta, El Mokhtar, Zehriye.

History
Ghazieh suffered from the 1837 earthquake, with 14 houses collapsing and 7 people killed.

Modern era

During 2006 Lebanon War, on the 7 August, Israeli warplanes bombed and killed a total of 16 civilians in Ghazieh. On the 8 August, Israeli airplanes killed another 10 civilians, in three different incidents.

References

Bibliography

External links
 Ghaziyeh, Localiban

Populated places in Sidon District